Yazidis in Syria refer to people born in or residing in Syria who adhere to Yazidism, a  strictly endogamous religion. Yazidis speak the Kurdish language of Kurmanji. Although some are scattered in Turkey and the Armenia, Iraq is the center of their religious life, the home of their Amir, and of the tomb of their most revered saint, Sheikh Adi. Yazidis in Syria live primarily in two communities, one in the Al-Jazira area and the other in the Kurd-Dagh. 

Population numbers for the Syrian Yazidi community are unclear. In 1963, the community was estimated at about 10,000, according to the national census, but numbers for 1987 were unavailable. There may be between about 12,000 and 15,000 Yazidis in Syria today. Since 2014, more Yazidis from Iraq have sought refuge in the Autonomous Administration of North and East Syria to escape the genocide of Yazidis by ISIL. In 2014, there were about 40,000 Yazidis in Syria, primarily in the Al-Jazirah.  

Following the extension of the Turkish occupation of northern Syria into the Kurdish-majority Afrin District, reports have emerged of Yazidis in demographically mixed villages of the Kurd-Dagh region being targeted by the Turkish-backed Syrian National Army (SNA) because of their religious identity, as well as having their shrines desecrated. As in October 2019 Turkey invaded the north eastern part of Syria; several Yazidi villages have been targeted and their inhabitants fled to the region still under the control of the AANES. Kidnapping of Yazidi women and girls by the SNA is an ongoing problem.

Notable Syrian-Yazidi people 
 Ibrahim Khalil: is a Yazidi singer from Syria.

See also 
Al-Jazira Province
List of Yazidi settlements
Genocide of Yazidis by ISIL

Further reading

References

 
Religion in Syria
Yazidi diaspora
Ethnic groups in Syria